Yurqunabad may refer to:
 Yurqunabad-e Olya
 Yurqunabad-e Sofla